The 147th Aviation Regiment is an aviation regiment of the U.S. Army.

Structure
 1st Battalion
 Headquarters and Headquarters Company
 Detachment 1 at Abrams Municipal Airport, Grand Ledge (MI ARNG)
Company A at Truax Field Air National Guard Base, Madison (WI ARNG)
Company B at Grand Ledge (MI ARNG)
Company C at Grand Ledge (MI ARNG)
 Detachment 1 (WI ARNG)
Company D (WI ARNG)
Detachment 1 at Grand Ledge (MI ARNG)
Company E (WI ARNG)
Detachment 1 at Grand Ledge (MI ARNG)
 2nd Battalion (Assault Helicopter) (MN ARNG)
 Headquarters and Headquarters Company
 Detachment 2 at Boone Municipal Airport, Boone (IA ARNG)
 Company A (UH-60)
 Company B (UH-60)
 Company C (UH-60) at Boone (IA ARNG)
 Company D (Aviation Maintenance)
 Detachment 2 at Boone (IA ARNG)
 Company E (FSC)
 Detachment 2 at Boone (IA ARNG)

References

147
Aviation